is the second Japanese single by French-Canadian singer Himeka. The single was released on November 25, 2009 on the Sony Music Japan International label. "Hatenaki Michi" is the ending theme song for the anime Tegami Bachi.
The single has a limited edition that contains the Anime Edit version of the leading song "Hatenaki Michi".

Track list

1 Limited Edition bonus track.

Charts

References

2009 singles
2009 songs